David Edú García Mitogo (born 18 May 1990) is an Equatorial Guinean footballer who plays as a forward for Tercera División club CD As Pontes. He has capped for the senior Equatorial Guinea national team.

Club career
Born in Bata, Mitogo moved to Spain at the age of only three. He began his youth career with CD La Morenica, and later joined SD Ponferradina as a cadet; however, he was dissatisfied with his time at the club and returned to his previous team at the end of the season.

At 16, Mitogo ultimately returned to Ponferradina to complete his formation. He made his senior debut with the reserve side, in the fourth division.

On 20 September 2009, aged 19, Mitogo made his first appearance for Ponferradina's main squad, in a third level match against SD Eibar, scoring the only goal of the game in the process. Still mainly registered with the B's, he appeared in a further six games for the first team as they finally achieved promotion to division two.

Playing for Ponferradina B against CD Huracán Z on 24 October 2010, Mitogo suffered a torn anterior cruciate ligament in his left knee, being sidelined for six months.

International career
In April 2010, Mitogo was called by the Equatoguinean national under-20 team for the second match against Gabon in the 2011 African Youth Championship qualifiers (preliminary round). He scored the Equatoguinean goal, in a 1–1 draw.

In late July 2010, Mitogo received his first callup for the full side, for a friendly with Morocco on 11 August. He came on as a substitute for Juan Mbela in the 67th minute.

Personal life
Mitogo came from a multiracial background. His white father, whose surname is García, was Spanish, while his black mother, surnamed Mitogo, was a Fang.

References

External links

Stats at FútbolEsta 
Stats at Galician Football Federation 

1990 births
Living people
People from Bata, Equatorial Guinea
Equatoguinean footballers
Association football forwards
Maltese Premier League players
Vittoriosa Stars F.C. players
Equatoguinean people of Spanish descent
Equatorial Guinea international footballers
Equatoguinean expatriate footballers
Equatoguinean expatriate sportspeople in Malta
Expatriate footballers in Malta
Citizens of Spain through descent
People from El Bierzo
Sportspeople from the Province of León
Spanish footballers
Footballers from Castile and León
Segunda División B players
SD Ponferradina players
CD Teruel footballers
Tercera División players
SD Ponferradina B players
SD Compostela footballers
Unionistas de Salamanca CF players
UD Somozas players
Divisiones Regionales de Fútbol players
Spanish sportspeople of Equatoguinean descent
Spanish expatriate footballers
Spanish expatriate sportspeople in Malta
CD Arenteiro players